The  is a constituency that represents Toyama Prefecture in the House of Councillors in the Diet of Japan. It has two Councillors in the 242-member house.

Outline
The constituency represents the entire population of Toyama Prefecture. The district elects two Councillors to six-year terms, one at alternating elections held every three years. The district has 888,832 registered voters as of September 2015. The Councillors currently representing Toyama are:
  (Liberal Democratic Party (LDP), second term; term ends in 2016. Previously represented the district from 2001-2007.)
  (LDP, first term; term ends in 2019)

Elected Councillors

Election results

See also
List of districts of the House of Councillors of Japan

References 

Districts of the House of Councillors (Japan)
Politics of Toyama Prefecture